Setamiyeh-ye Bozorg (also Romanized as Setāmīyeh-ye Bozorg; also known as Sattamiyeh and Setāmīyeh-ye Bozory) is a village in Esmailiyeh Rural District, in the Central District of Ahvaz County, Khuzestan Province, Iran. At the 2006 census, its population was 396, in 71 families.

References 

Populated places in Ahvaz County